The 1994–1996 United States broadcast television realignment consisted of a series of events, primarily involving affiliation switches between television stations, that resulted from a multimillion-dollar deal between the Fox television network (commonly known as simply Fox) and New World Communications, a media company that – through its then-recently formed broadcasting division – owned several VHF television stations affiliated with major broadcast television networks, primarily CBS.

The major impetus for the changes was to allow Fox to improve its local affiliate coverage, in preparation for the commencement of its rights to the National Football Conference (NFC) television package, which the National Football League (NFL) awarded to the fledgling network in December 1993. As a result of various other deals that followed as a result of the affiliation switches created by the deal between Fox and New World, most notably the buyout of CBS by Westinghouse, the switches constituted some of the most sweeping changes in American television history. As a result of this realignment, Fox ascended to the status of a major television network, comparable in influence to the Big Three U.S. television networks (CBS, NBC, and ABC).

Nearly 70 stations in 30 media markets throughout the United States changed affiliations starting in September 1994 and continuing through September 1996 (although an additional affiliation switch would occur in February 1997, through the launch of an upstart station that gained its network partner through one of the ancillary deals), which – along with the concurrent January 1995 launches of The WB Television Network (a joint venture between Time Warner, the Tribune Company, and the network's founding chief executive officer, Jamie Kellner) and the United Paramount Network (UPN) (founded by Chris-Craft/United Television, through a programming partnership with Paramount Television), both of which affiliated with certain stations that lost their previous network partners through the various affiliation agreements – marked some of the most expansive changes ever to have occurred in American television.

Fox acquires partial television rights to the NFL

For some time dating back to the preparations for its launch, Rupert Murdoch – chief executive officer of News Corporation, the then-corporate parent of the Fox Broadcasting Company – had wanted a major-league sports presence for his network. Murdoch thought that landing a live sports broadcasting package would help build Fox's nascent profile and elevate it to the level of ABC, CBS, and NBC, the three existing major commercial broadcast networks in the United States at the time.

In January 1987, as it was preparing to venture into prime time programming (which would start on April 5), Fox decided to place a bid to acquire the rights to Monday Night Football – then the league's crown-jewel program – from ABC, for about $1.3 billion, the same amount that network had been paying at the time for the contract; negotiations between the league and ABC to renew the contract had earlier stalled due to an increase in the expense for the rights. However, the NFL, in part because Fox had not established itself as a major network, chose to reject the bid and subsequently resumed discussions with ABC, ultimately reaching a deal to keep the Monday Night Football package on that network. Six years after Fox's first attempt to acquire the rights had foundered, the NFL opened up negotiations for the television contracts to both of its conferences as well as for the Sunday and Monday prime time football packages. Fox decided to submit another bid to the NFL, this time, making a more aggressive move to successfully secure a contract with the league, on the acknowledgment that it would likely need to bid a considerably higher amount than the incumbent networks that were seeking to renew or expand upon their existing NFL television rights would elect to offer to acquire a piece of the package.

On December 17, 1993, Fox stunned the sports and television worlds by reaching a four-year, $1.58 billion contract with the NFL effective with the 1994 season to televise regular season and playoff games involving teams in the National Football Conference – a package that had been owned by CBS since 1956, fourteen years prior to the merger of the NFL and the American Football League (AFL) that resulted in the teams that composed the two leagues respectively being divided between the NFC and the American Football Conference (AFC) – as well as Super Bowl XXXI (which was to be held in January 1997). CBS, then run by the cost-cutting Laurence Tisch, had reportedly bid only $290 million to retain the rights to the NFC television package and was unwilling to even approach the price of the Fox offer, which exceeded the bid made by CBS by $1.29 billion (or more than $100 million per year).

At the time of Fox's bid, some of its owned-and-operated stations (except those in New York City, Los Angeles, Washington, D.C., and Salt Lake City) and most of its affiliates (except those in San Francisco, Seattle, Las Vegas, and Miami) were UHF stations that transmitted at a lower radiated power than its VHF counterparts . Most of the stations that carried the network's programming also had little to no prior history as a major network affiliate; however, some (among them, its outlets in the former three aforementioned markets where it owned a station) were once affiliated with at least one of the Big Three networks or even the DuMont Television Network earlier in their histories. As Fox put together its new sports division to cover the NFL, it sought to affiliate with VHF stations (broadcasting on channels 2 to 13) that had more established histories, and carried more value with advertisers.

New World Communications deal

On May 23, 1994, Fox agreed to purchase a 20% stake (an investment of $500 million) in New World Communications, a media company controlled by New York City-based investor Ronald Perelman, who purchased the company in 1989 in the midst of its restructuring under a Chapter 11 bankruptcy declaration.

New World – which was founded by actor/producer/director Roger Corman and his brother, film producer Gene Corman, on July 8, 1970, as an independent producer of low-budget feature films, and starting in 1984, began producing television programs such as Crime Story, Santa Barbara, and The Wonder Years – expanded into television broadcasting on February 17, 1993, after Perelman purchased a 51% ownership stake in Denver-based SCI Television (a group descended from the former Storer Communications that was undergoing a complex restructuring of its debt) from the Apollo Partners-controlled Gillett Holdings for $100 million and $63 million in newly issued debt. The day prior to that deal, SCI purchased WTVT in Tampa, Florida, from Gillett Holdings in a separate agreement for $163 million. New World expanded its broadcasting holdings in May 1994, when it bought four stations owned by Argyle Television Holdings (which Argyle had acquired from the Times Mirror Company the year prior) in a $717 million purchase option-structured deal, followed three weeks later by the purchase of four stations owned by Great American Communications (which, several months later, would be renamed Citicasters upon the completion of its corporate restructuring) for $350 million in cash and $10 million in share warrants.

Fox's partial equity acquisition of New World Communications also included a multi-year agreement, under which it would affiliate most of the television stations that the company had owned outright or was in the process of acquiring from Argyle and Great American with the network, once individual affiliation contracts with each of the stations' existing network partners expired. The following stations were part of the deal:

Existing New World stations
 KNSD (channel 39), San Diego, California – affiliated with NBC
 WAGA-TV (channel 5), Atlanta, Georgia – affiliated with CBS
 WITI-TV (channel 6), Milwaukee, Wisconsin – affiliated with CBS
 WJBK-TV (channel 2), Detroit, Michigan – affiliated with CBS
 WJW-TV (channel 8), Cleveland, Ohio – affiliated with CBS
 WSBK-TV (channel 38), Boston, Massachusetts – operated as an independent station
 WTVT (channel 13), Tampa, Florida – affiliated with CBS

Stations acquired from Argyle Television
 KDFW-TV (channel 4), Dallas, Texas – affiliated with CBS
 KTBC-TV (channel 7), Austin, Texas – affiliated with CBS
 KTVI (channel 2), St. Louis, Missouri – affiliated with ABC
 WVTM-TV (channel 13), Birmingham, Alabama – affiliated with NBC

Stations acquired from Great American Communications
 KSAZ-TV (channel 10), Phoenix, Arizona – affiliated with CBS
 WBRC-TV (channel 6), Birmingham, Alabama – affiliated with ABC
 WDAF-TV (channel 4), Kansas City, Missouri – affiliated with NBC
 WGHP (channel 8), High Point, North Carolina – affiliated with ABC

Exceptions
Several stations owned by the groups involved in the New World acquisitions were either sold to other parties or left out of the deal:
 New World retained ownership of KNSD and WVTM in the interim, with both stations remaining NBC affiliates; in the former case, KNSD would not have joined Fox in any event – despite the network's affiliation agreement with New World – as Fox already had a VHF affiliate in San Diego at the time, Tijuana, Baja California, Mexico-based XETV (channel 6, later a CW affiliate and now a Canal 5 station targeting Tijuana). New World would eventually sell both stations to NBC's owned-and-operated station group, NBC Television Stations, for $425 million on May 22, 1996. NBC later sold WVTM to Media General on April 6, 2006, as part of the sale of its owned-and-operated stations in four mid-sized markets – alongside WCMH-TV (channel 4) in Columbus, Ohio; WJAR-TV (channel 10) in Providence, Rhode Island; and WNCN (channel 17, now a CBS affiliate) in Goldsboro, North Carolina, all three of which were acquired through NBC's August 1996 purchase of The Outlet Company – for $600 million (to acquire WVTM, Media General sold its existing station in Birmingham, CBS affiliate WIAT (channel 42), to New Vision Television for $35 million on August 2, 2006; although the WIAT sale was conducted to comply with a clause in the Federal Communications Commission (FCC)'s media ownership rules that forbade common ownership of two of the four highest-rated television stations in the same market, the FCC granted Media General a temporary cross-ownership waiver to allow it to keep both stations for six months after the WVTM purchase was completed).
 As the FCC's media ownership rules at the time prohibited a single company from owning more than twelve television stations nationwide (the Argyle and Citicasters purchases, combined with its existing seven stations, resulted in New World having three stations over the limit (fifteen overall)) and forbade common ownership of two commercial television stations in the same market, New World established a trust company in preparation for its sale of WGHP and WBRC, which it would place the stations into in September and October 1994 respectively. Under the arrangement, New World owned the licenses of WBRC and WGHP, while Citicasters continued to control their operations under outsourcing agreements. In April 1995, Citicasters transferred the operations of WBRC and WGHP to the Fox network's broadcasting subsidiary, Fox Television Stations, which assumed operational control through time brokerage agreements with New World. Both stations were sold directly to Fox Television Stations three months later on July 22, 1995, in exchange for $130 million in promissory notes.
 New World excluded WSBK from the Fox affiliation deal as Fox Television Stations had chosen to re-acquire WFXT (channel 25) – which it previously owned from 1987 to 1989, when it sold the station to the Boston Celtics (at the time of the original sale, News Corporation owned the Boston Herald and WFXT through a cross-ownership waiver, as FCC rules otherwise forbid common ownership of newspapers and full-power television stations in the same market). Due to the same television ownership limits that led to WBRC and WGHP being sold to Fox, WSBK was later sold to the Paramount Stations Group, and became a charter affiliate of the United Paramount Network (UPN) when it launched on January 16, 1995.
 Great American Communications/Citicasters retained ownership of WKRC-TV (channel 12) in Cincinnati, Ohio (whose NFL franchise, the Bengals, are part of the American Football Conference, which then maintained a broadcast rights deal with NBC) and WTSP (channel 10) in St. Petersburg, Florida – both of which were ABC affiliates at the time. In the case of Tampa, New World opted to keep WTVT, which had higher viewership and a broader signal coverage area, which – unlike WTSP – included Sarasota (WTSP's transmitter was short-spaced to avoid signal interference with WPLG (channel 10) in Miami, resulting in ABC maintaining an affiliation with WWSB (channel 40) to serve the southern part of the Tampa market), while Cincinnati Fox affiliate WXIX-TV, despite being on UHF channel 19, was (and still is) competitive with the market's other stations and far and away ahead of the only other full-power independent commercial station in the market, WSTR-TV, which resided on channel 64.

NFL connection to deal

The key to the deal was that Fox upgraded its stations in several markets. Prior to the deal, of the fourteen NFC teams at the time, only four – the Los Angeles Rams, New York Giants, San Francisco 49ers, and Washington Redskins (now known as the Washington Commanders) – were located in markets with VHF Fox affiliates. Of those four markets' Fox stations, WNYW (channel 5) in New York City, KTTV (channel 11) in Los Angeles, and WTTG (channel 5) in Washington, D.C. are three of the network's original six owned-and-operated outlets; the San Francisco Bay Area affiliate, Oakland, California-licensed KTVU (channel 2), was owned by Cox Media Group at the time, and would not be acquired by Fox until October 2014.

Most of the stations involved in the New World deal were located in markets with teams in the NFC, which was then considered the more prestigious of the two NFL conferences. In particular, the conference had teams located in nine of the ten largest television markets at the time – with the exception of Boston, whose NFL team, the New England Patriots, played in the AFC. In addition, most of the NFC teams existed before the formation of the predecessor American Football League and therefore contain longer histories, rivalries and traditions. During this time, the NFC was also in the midst of a 13-game winning streak against the AFC in the Super Bowl. Many of the stations slated to join Fox were CBS affiliates based in markets where NFC teams were located, therefore fans would continue to see at least their team's road games on (the same) local VHF stations.

NFC teams in markets related to deal
 Arizona Cardinals (KSAZ-TV)
 Atlanta Falcons (WAGA)
 Carolina Panthers (WGHP)
 Dallas Cowboys (KDFW and KTBC)
 Detroit Lions (WJBK)
 Green Bay Packers (WITI)
 St. Louis Rams (KTVI; 1995–2016)
 Tampa Bay Buccaneers (WTVT)

AFC teams in markets related to deal
 Cleveland Browns (WJW)
 Kansas City Chiefs (WDAF)

KTBC and WITI served markets containing significant fan bases for nearby NFC teams. KTBC had aired Dallas Cowboys games (including exhibitions that occur during the preseason) for years in the Austin market; WITI, meanwhile, had broadcast Green Bay Packers games to its Milwaukee audience since September 1977, six months after it rejoined CBS in a reversal of an April 1961 affiliation swap with WISN (channel 12) in which the two stations had traded their respective affiliations with ABC and CBS (the Packers had played select regular season games in Milwaukee through the 1994 season). Due to Green Bay being a sweeps-only Nielsen market that used paper diary-only measurement for most of its history, the larger Milwaukee market was (and continues to be) often cited more for ratings purposes by the NFL and networks that carry the league's games than the numbers for the smaller Green Bay market. In Cleveland and Kansas City, WJW and WDAF respectively aired Browns (except following the team's relocation to Baltimore in 1996 before their recreation as an expansion team in 1998) and Chiefs games only when Fox aired a game featuring an NFC opponent (ironically in Kansas City, WDAF aired most of the Chiefs' games as an NBC affiliate by way of that network's rights to the AFC).

In 1995, St. Louis became the ninth NFC market with a VHF Fox affiliate as a result of the Rams' relocation from Los Angeles, and KTVI – the ninth station (and the sixth in an NFC market) involved in the New World deal to switch – affiliating with the network. That year, the Carolina Panthers joined the NFL as an expansion team, which made WGHP another satellite "home" station for an NFL team as the Panthers are based in Charlotte, which is directly south of the Piedmont Triad region where WGHP serves.

Because of the time it took for the FCC to approve News Corporation's investment in New World and the subsequent Burnham station purchases (as well as waiting for affiliation contracts to expire), the old, "lame duck" affiliates carried Fox's NFL telecasts as late as the 1995 season in some markets. For example, most Cowboys games aired on KDAF (channel 33, now a CW affiliate) in Dallas and KBVO (channel 42, now CBS affiliate KEYE-TV) in Austin, while the Lions were seen on WKBD-TV (channel 50, now a CW owned-and-operated station). WCGV-TV (channel 24, now a MyNetworkTV affiliate and operating as a subchannel of ex-sister station WVTV) in Milwaukee carried Packers telecasts until WITI disaffiliated from CBS on December 1, 1994; WCGV's carriage of the Packers for the first three months of the 1994 season marked the only break in WITI's carriage of the team's games since it rejoined CBS in 1977. New Orleans Saints games were carried on WNOL (channel 38, now a CW affiliate) until December 1995.

Burnham Broadcasting

In March 1994, Fox and Savoy Pictures established a venture called SF Broadcasting to acquire and operate additional television stations. Fox held no voting stock in the company (which instead was held entirely by Savoy Pictures chairmen Victor Kaufman and Lewis Korman), but supplied 58% of the original $100 million in capital. Weeks after the New World deal, SF acquired four stations owned by Burnham Broadcasting:
 KHON-TV (channel 2), Honolulu, Hawaii – affiliated with NBC
 WALA-TV (channel 10), Mobile, Alabama – affiliated with NBC
 WLUK-TV (channel 11), Green Bay, Wisconsin – affiliated with NBC
 WVUE (channel 8), New Orleans, Louisiana – affiliated with ABC

SF Broadcasting purchased WLUK-TV on July 29, 1994, for $38 million, and WALA, KHON and WVUE one month later on August 25 for $229 million. The deal gave Fox upgrades in the home market of the Saints and the local market of the Packers (Fox had already acquired the CBS affiliate in Milwaukee, the Packers other official home market), giving Fox VHF affiliates in eleven of the fifteen NFC markets. On September 23, 1994, NBC filed a petition to the FCC challenging the purchase of WLUK, alleging that SF was a shell corporation created by News Corporation to circumvent FCC limits on the amount of capital that a foreign company can invest in an American television station; NBC withdrew the petition on February 17, 1995, and the FCC approved the deal two months later on April 27. After the sale was completed, the stations did not immediately switch their affiliations to Fox: WLUK became a Fox affiliate on August 28, 1995, while the remaining three stations became Fox affiliates on January 1, 1996.

Burnham spun off ABC affiliate KBAK-TV (channel 29, now a CBS affiliate) in Bakersfield, California, to Westwind Communications, a company founded by several former Burnham executives. The season after WLUK first began carrying the Packers as a Fox station, the team won Super Bowl XXXI, the first Super Bowl televised by the network.

Repercussions

The affiliation changes informally commenced on April 17, 1994, when ABC affiliate KARD (channel 14) in Monroe, Louisiana, became a Fox affiliate, through an agreement unrelated to the network's group affiliation deal with New World; CBS affiliates KECY-TV (channel 9) in El Centro, California/Yuma, Arizona and WJKA-TV (channel 26, now WSFX-TV) in Wilmington, North Carolina also switched their affiliations to Fox that same year, along with TBN affiliate KVCT (channel 19) in Victoria and low-powered independent station K47DF (channel 47; now K22JA-D, which returned to independent status in February 2008) in Corpus Christi, Texas.

The switches officially began on September 3, 1994, when CBS affiliate WJW-TV became the first station involved in the New World agreement to switch its affiliation to Fox; the CBS affiliation in Cleveland consequently moved to the market's Fox charter affiliate WOIO (channel 19). Sister station WDAF-TV followed suit on September 12, trading affiliations with original Fox affiliate KSHB-TV (channel 41; New World had finalized its acquisition of KSAZ-TV (which temporarily became an independent station) and WDAF only three days before the latter switched from NBC to Fox). The majority of the New World stations switched their affiliations to Fox between December 1994 and August 1995 (WGHP and WBRC respectively did not become Fox stations until September 1, 1995, and September 1, 1996, due to their existing affiliation contracts with ABC). The affiliation changes formally concluded on September 1, 1996, when WBRC officially joined Fox as an owned-and-operated station; however, an additional affiliation transaction caused by an agreement spurred by the Fox-New World deal occurred on February 1, 1997, when upstart WJXX (channel 25) in Orange Park, Florida, signed on as the new ABC affiliate for the Jacksonville market, replacing WJKS (channel 17, now WCWJ), which became a WB affiliate under the callsign WJWB.

With ABC, NBC and CBS suddenly in need of new affiliates in the markets affected by the New World and Burnham deals, major affiliation shakeups began to occur. In some markets (such as Kansas City, Austin, Cleveland, Piedmont Triad, St. Louis and Honolulu), the old Fox affiliates simply assumed the previous affiliation of the new Fox affiliate; in other markets (such as Detroit, New Orleans and Phoenix), the former Fox station affiliated with a network that was not the prior affiliation of the new Fox outlet, resulting in swaps involving multiple stations. The shakeups involving the Big Three networks were mostly along station group lines, which also affected markets where neither New World or Burnham had operated stations.

WBRC's switch in Birmingham resulted in the most complicated swap, in which six stations changed affiliations. Although Fox Television Stations assumed ownership once its purchase of the station from the New World-controlled trust was completed in January 1996, it had to continue operating WBRC as an ABC station for nine additional months as its affiliation contract with the network did not expire until August 31, 1996; as Fox had purchased WBRC the previous summer, this gave ABC a year's leeway to find a new affiliate in the area. In January 1996, it reached a unique deal with Allbritton Communications in which WCFT-TV (channel 33, now Heroes & Icons affiliate WSES) and WJSU-TV (channel 40, now WGWW, also a Heroes & Icons affiliate), the respective CBS affiliates for Tuscaloosa and Anniston (which had both been annexed from the Birmingham Designated Market Area by Arbitron in 1977, and eventually were collapsed back into that market by Nielsen in September 1998), would jointly become the ABC affiliate for central Alabama (weeks prior to that deal, Allbritton had entered into an agreement with Osborne Communications Corporation to take over the operations of WJSU under a local marketing agreement). However, because over-the-air reception of both stations in Birmingham proper was marginal at best and neither would likely be able to be counted in Nielsen ratings reports for that market as WCFT and WJSU were officially out-of-market stations, Allbritton purchased low-power independent station W58CK (channel 58, now WBMA-LD); under the deal, Albritton would also affiliate W58CK with ABC and make it the main station of the cluster, while WCFT and WJSU would serve as its satellites. Gadsden Fox affiliate WNAL-TV (channel 44, now WPXH-TV) replaced WJSU-TV as the CBS affiliate for northeast Alabama – the second in the area, alongside Birmingham's WIAT (WNAL would later become the Pax TV (now Ion Television) O&O for the entire Birmingham market in August 1999, three years after it was acquired by Paxson Communications (now Ion Media Networks), the network's parent company). WTTO (channel 21) and its semi-satellite WDBB (channel 17), the Fox affiliates for Birmingham and Tuscaloosa, became independent stations before affiliating with The WB in February 1997, several months after WDBB became a full-time repeater of WTTO.

Among the many deals that resulted, ABC reached a group agreement with Scripps-Howard Broadcasting on June 16, 1994, after CBS approached WEWS (channel 5) in Cleveland and WXYZ-TV (channel 7) in Detroit about replacing WJW and WJBK as its affiliates for those markets. Under that agreement, in addition to renewing affiliation agreements with the company's two largest stations, Scripps also agreed to switch the affiliations of three other stations (NBC affiliate WMAR-TV (channel 2) in Baltimore; and two Fox affiliates set to be displaced by the New World deal, KNXV-TV (channel 15) in Phoenix and WFTS-TV (channel 28) in Tampa) to the network. In September 1995, Scripps-owned CBS affiliate WCPO-TV (channel 9) in Cincinnati agreed to switch to ABC, but that station had to wait until June 3, 1996, to switch its affiliation due to its then-existing affiliation contract with CBS. McGraw-Hill, River City Broadcasting and Allbritton Communications also expanded their relationships with ABC, adding a combined five affiliates (two of which maintained satellite stations, including the W58CK/WCFT/WJSU cluster in Birmingham) as part of deals that renewed agreements with existing ABC stations owned by both companies.

Westinghouse Broadcasting (popularly known as Group W), concerned over its top-rated Baltimore station WJZ-TV (channel 13) losing its ABC affiliation to WMAR-TV, reached a deal to affiliate WJZ-TV and its two NBC affiliates (WBZ-TV (channel 4) in Boston and KYW-TV (channel 3) in Philadelphia) with CBS on July 14, 1994, as part of a deal that renewed the network's affiliation agreements with KDKA-TV (channel 2) in Pittsburgh and KPIX (channel 5) in San Francisco. KYW-TV's switch to CBS prompted the network to sell its longtime Philadelphia O&O WCAU-TV (channel 10) to NBC (incidentally, New World briefly considered purchasing WCAU with the intent to convert it into a Fox affiliate; Paramount Stations Group would sell that network's existing affiliate WTXF-TV (channel 29) to Fox Television Stations, while in turn, acquiring independent station WGBS (channel 57, now CW owned-and-operated station WPSG) – which Fox attempted to purchase in August 1993, before terminating that deal to acquire WTXF – from Combined Broadcasting). After CBS discovered that an outright sale of WCAU would have resulted it having to pay a high capital gains tax rate from the proceeds accrued, CBS, Group W and NBC entered into a complex trade deal involving four stations which took effect on September 10, 1995. NBC traded KCNC-TV (channel 4) in Denver and KUTV (channel 2) in Salt Lake City, to CBS; meanwhile, CBS-owned WCIX (channel 6, now WFOR-TV on channel 4) in Miami swapped transmitter facilities and channel frequencies with NBC-owned WTVJ (channel 4, now on channel 6) as compensation for the trades.

As a result of losing the National Football Conference television rights to Fox, CBSs problems accelerated as it struggled to compete in the ratings (lagging behind ABC and NBC, but placing ahead of Fox) with a slate of programming that attracted an older audience than the other networks. As a direct result of the New World-Fox alliance, only six of the new CBS affiliates were VHF stations (including KTVT (channel 11) in Dallas-Fort Worth; KSTW (channel 11) in Seattle–Tacoma and KPHO-TV (channel 5) in Phoenix, although KSTW would lose its CBS affiliation to the market's previous affiliate, KIRO-TV (channel 7), on June 30, 1997, in a deal that resulted in KSTW assuming the UPN affiliation held by KIRO since January 1995); in Atlanta, Detroit and Milwaukee, CBS found itself in the extremely undesirable situation of ending up on low-profile UHF stations with far less transmitting power and viewer recognition than their previous affiliates or even the UHF stations that CBS affiliated with in other markets, due in part to unwillingness by other local stations to agree to switch to the then-struggling network. While the former CBS affiliates in the three markets – WAGA, WJBK and WITI – were all considered to be ratings contenders, local viewership for CBS programming dropped significantly after the network moved to the lower-profile UHF stations, which had virtually no significant history as a former major network affiliate or as a first-tier independent station. The network's viewership eventually recovered, and CBS became the most-watched broadcast television network in the U.S. by 1999.

One major positive that came from the deal was an increase in local news programming on the new Fox affiliates, a benefit that came as the network had demanded that its affiliates launch newscasts in the run-up to the launches of Fox News Channel and the Fox NewsEdge affiliate news service in August 1996. The new Fox affiliates retained most of their existing newscasts, but expanded their morning newscasts by one or two hours and early evening newscasts by a half-hour to replace news programs aired by their former network, with the majority also adding newscasts in the final hour of prime time (9:00 or 10:00 pm, depending on the time zone). However, most of the twelve stations involved in the New World-Fox deal chose not to carry Fox's children's programming block, Fox Kids, which resulted in Fox deciding to allow its owned-and-operated stations and affiliates to drop the block if another local station was interested in airing it. A complication of this was that religious-secular independent KNLC (channel 24, now a MeTV affiliate) in St. Louis, owned by the New Life Christian Church, chose to air ministry messages (dealing with controversial topics such as abortion, same-sex marriage and the death penalty) instead of commercials during the block's program breaks, resulting in Fox moving the block to KTVI in September 1996, after several attempts by Ted Koplar to bring the Fox Kids block to The WB affiliate in St. Louis has been turned down.

Many of the new Big Three UHF affiliates found difficulty gaining an audience, and all but two of them had to give in to launching newscasts to back up the national news programs provided by the networks. Four stations affected by the switches – WEVV-TV (channel 44) in Evansville, Indiana (which became a CBS affiliate after losing its Fox affiliation to WTVW (channel 7, now a CW affiliate) through a separate deal), WWJ-TV (channel 62) in Detroit, KDNL-TV (channel 30) in St. Louis and WXLV-TV (channel 45) in the Piedmont Triad – failed to gain traction with their competitors in the local news field and eventually either cancelled or outsourced their newscasts (although WWJ-TV, KDNL-TV and WXLV have since made other attempts at news programming in some form to mixed results; WEVV-TV was the only one that failed in its previous news programming to fully resume in-house news operations, launching a news department in August 2015, months after its sale to Bayou City Broadcasting was finalized). Generally, the stations that continue to air newscasts to this day have generally finished in third or fourth place behind their VHF competitors, although some have experienced gradual ratings growth.

Post-switchover changes
Fox continued to upgrade its stations in at least two unrelated deals struck later:
 On August 18, 1994, Fox Television Stations purchased ABC affiliate WHBQ-TV (channel 13) in Memphis – a station that was once part of the RKO General broadcasting empire, which had collapsed in the late 1980s due to corruption and perjury – from Communications Corporation of America. Former Fox affiliate WPTY-TV (channel 24, now WATN-TV) assumed the ABC affiliation on December 1, 1995.
 On September 8, 2002, UPN affiliate KMSP-TV (channel 9) in Minneapolis–St. Paul – the home market of the Minnesota Vikings of the NFC – became a Fox affiliate, trading affiliations with WFTC (channel 29, now a MyNetworkTV owned-and-operated station). A similar swap occurred that year in Portland, Oregon, when the Meredith Corporation swapped the affiliations of Fox affiliate KPDX (channel 49, now a MyNetworkTV affiliate) and newly acquired UPN affiliate KPTV (channel 12); KPTV and KMSP were previously affiliated with Fox from the network's launch in October 1986 until September 1988, when they both disaffiliated from the network due to issues over its then-weakly performing programs. Fox had purchased both stations as part of its 2001 acquisition of Chris-Craft Industries' television station group, but traded KPTV to Meredith in exchange for WOFL (channel 35) in Orlando and its Gainesville semi-satellite WOGX (channel 51) in 2002.

Between 1997 and 1999, Fox gained several affiliates in smaller markets, including WFFF-TV (channel 44) in Plattsburgh, New York; WVFX (channel 10) in Clarksburg, West Virginia; WFXS (channel 55) in Wausau/Rhinelander, Wisconsin; KFFX-TV (channel 11) in Yakima, Washington; KPTH (channel 44) in Sioux City, Iowa; and K24EJ (channel 24, now KKFX-CD) in Santa Barbara/San Luis Obispo, California. However, there have been several occasions since that time when several markets lost over-the-air availability of Fox programming with no immediate local replacement. For example, in October 2001, Pegasus Broadcasting-owned WDBD (channel 40) in Jackson, Mississippi (which would reaffiliate with Fox in 2006) and WPXT (channel 51, now a CW affiliate) in Portland, Maine became affiliates of The WB due to a payment dispute between Pegasus and Fox; the network would not be available over-the-air in the state of Maine until April 2003 (after an attempt by WCKD-LP [channel 30, now defunct] to affiliate with the network fell through), when Pax station WPFO (channel 23) joined Fox, restoring over-the-air availability of the network to the Portland market, and WFVX-LP (channel 22) signed on as the network's first Bangor-based affiliate.

On July 14, 1997, Sinclair Broadcast Group and Time Warner reached a long-term affiliation agreement to switch several of the former's television stations, including Fox affiliates in Raleigh (WLFL [channel 22, now a CW affiliate]) and Norfolk (WTVZ [channel 33, now a MyNetworkTV affiliate]), as well as UPN affiliates in Pittsburgh (WPTT-TV [channel 22, subsequently re-called WCWB and now operating as MyNetworkTV affiliate WPNT]), Baltimore (WNUV [channel 54, now a CW affiliate]), Cincinnati (WSTR-TV [channel 64, now a MyNetworkTV affiliate]), San Antonio (KRRT [channel 35, now Dabl affiliate KMYS]), Oklahoma City (KOCB [channel 34, now a CW affiliate]), and Indianapolis (WTTV [channel 4], which was added to the agreement through a separate deal), to The WB. In most of the markets affected, UPN programming was displaced to an upstart general entertainment station or a converted former non-commercial outlet (in one such example, UPN sister company Paramount Stations Group was forced to purchase PBS member station KTLC [channel 43, subsequently re-called KPSG and then KAUT-TV], a former independent station-turned-Fox affiliate that previous owner Heritage Media had donated to the Oklahoma Educational Television Authority [OETA] in 1991, to replace KOCB as the network's Oklahoma City affiliate); in Raleigh (where Fox moved to WRAZ-TV [channel 50]) and Indianapolis (where UPN moved to WNDY-TV [channel 23, now a MyNetworkTV affiliate]), however, the former WB stations in those markets took over the affiliation previously held by the Sinclair-run WB outlet.

In early 2002, two Televisa-owned stations, XHFOX-TV (channel 57, now XHTAM-TDT) in Matamoros/Reynosa (serving the Harlingen–Brownsville–McAllen market) and XHFTX-TV (channel 2, now XHLAR-TDT) in Nuevo Laredo (serving the Laredo market), were stripped of their affiliations with Fox and consequently became affiliates of Televisa's Canal de las Estrellas (now simply Las Estrellas). This left the western and southern areas of South Texas without an over-the-air Fox affiliate until 2005, when XHRIO-TV (channel 2 [later channel 15], later a CW Plus affiliate, now silent as of 2021) became the network's affiliate for the Harlingen–Brownsville–McAllen market. (KXOF-CA [channel 39, now UniMás affiliate KETF-CD] signed on as the network's new affiliate for the Laredo area in July 2007; it swapped programming and call letters with a sister low-power outlet on virtual channel 31 in December 2018.) In early 2004, NBC and LIN Television announced an agreement to renew the contracts of the company's existing NBC stations, while also switching its then-ABC stations in Dayton, Ohio (WDTN [channel 2]) and Springfield–Decatur, Illinois (WAND-TV [channel 17]) to the network; the decision to flip LIN's Dayton and Springfield stations was in response to a separate deal involving Sinclair Broadcast Group that resulted in ABC moving its programming to the outgoing NBC affiliates in both markets (WKEF [channel 22], and WICS [channel 20] and its Champaign semi-satellite WICD [channel 15], respectively). In any case, the LIN and Sinclair deals reversed a January 1980 network swap between WDTN and WKEF, one of several occurring between 1979 and 1981 as NBC's national viewership languished in third place (behind ABC and CBS).

Another switch occurred in San Diego on August 1, 2008, when KSWB-TV (channel 69) – one of 16 charter CW affiliates owned by Tribune Broadcasting – became a Fox affiliate, swapping networks with XETV. Although it might have been seen as a downgrade on the surface, as KSWB's analog position was UHF channel 69 while XETV was on VHF channel 6, the market has heavy cable penetration and the majority of its stations are on UHF, which then brand by their dominant cable channel slot rather than their broadcast channel allocation; as such, KSWB is branded as "Fox 5" and only uses its over-the-air channel position as its PSIP virtual channel, in legally required station IDs and (from 2008 to 2012) a short sweep of a "Fox 69" logo in the bug seen during its newscasts. With the switch to Fox, Tribune re-established a news department for KSWB (which produced a prime time newscast from September 1999 to September 2005, before production was taken over by KNSD through a news share agreement). In regards to the NFL, this switchover was an irrelevant issue; as the Chargers, who played in San Diego until 2017, play in the AFC, most of the team's Sunday afternoon games aired locally on CBS affiliate KFMB-TV (channel 8) from 1998 to 2016 (ironically, Chargers games had aired on KNSD from 1977 to 1997). Beginning with the 2017 season, with the Chargers moving to the Los Angeles area, the primary station for the team's games in that market is CBS' West Coast flagship KCBS-TV (channel 2). Another affiliation switch came in the Beaumont television market was in 2008 when Nexstar Broadcasting Group struck a deal with Fox to affiliate it with NBC affiliate KBTV.

CBS saw an affiliate downgrade from VHF to UHF in an unrelated transaction in the Jacksonville–Brunswick market – home of the Jacksonville Jaguars (whose games also air on CBS through its rights to the AFC) – after Post-Newsweek Stations announced in April 2002 that it would end the network's affiliation with WJXT (channel 4) due to a dispute over planned reverse compensation demands by CBS. On July 15, 2002, WTEV-TV (channel 47, now WJAX-TV) became the market's CBS affiliate, with Fox-affiliated sister station WAWS (channel 30, now WFOX-TV) assuming its displaced UPN affiliation as a secondary affiliation. The loss of the CBS affiliation on WJXT, which became an independent station, caused a switch in nearby Gainesville (home to the University of Florida, whose football games regularly air on CBS through its contract with the Southeastern Conference), where primary WB/secondary UPN affiliate WGFL (channel 53, now on channel 28) switched to CBS for the network to remain available in that area; UPN and The WB were relegated to a digital subchannel of the station (now affiliated with MyNetworkTV, as well as low-power WMYG-LP), one of the earliest instances of a subchannel being established to carry a major network prior to the 2006 realignment resulting from the merger of The WB and UPN to form The CW.

Out of the CBS affiliates in the 16 AFC markets, WJAX-TV and Cleveland affiliate WOIO – in the home market of the Browns – are the only stations which have virtual channels corresponding to the UHF band. WOIO (which actually transmits its digital signal over VHF channel 10) was Cleveland's charter Fox affiliate before swapping affiliations with WJW as a result of the New World deal, and has even held rights to the teams' preseason games from 1988 as a Fox affiliate until 1995, and in 2005 as a CBS affiliate. Currently, WOIO only airs the Browns' CBS game telecasts, due to conflicts between the team and WOIO's news department in the past over coverage about personal issues involving team players and ownership that resulted in the Browns organization choosing not to renew its preseason rights deal with WOIO after the 2005 season; ABC affiliate WEWS (channel 5) carries the bulk of the team's preseason games and other Browns programs.

On July 1, 2013, CW affiliate WJZY (channel 46) in Charlotte, North Carolina, became a Fox owned-and-operated station (now owned by Nexstar Media Group), after Fox Television Stations purchased it and MyNetworkTV-affiliated sister station WMYT-TV (channel 55) from the Capitol Broadcasting Company that April; similar to the situation it faced following its purchase of WBRC, Fox Television Stations had to operate WJZY as a CW affiliate for three months after its purchase of the WJZY-WMYT duopoly was completed, as that station's existing contract with the network did not expire until June 30, 2013. The switch resulted in an upgrade for The CW through the network's move to displaced Fox charter affiliate WCCB, as that station broadcasts on UHF channel 18, and also has a news department (becoming one of a handful of news-producing CW-affiliated stations as a result), which WJZY did not have until January 2014 as a Fox O&O.

Another notable switch involving an AFC market occurred in Indianapolis, after a dispute between station management at WISH-TV (channel 8) and the network during affiliation renewal negotiations over reverse compensation demands led CBS to reach an agreement with Tribune Broadcasting on August 11, 2014, in which WTTV and its Kokomo-based satellite WTTK (channel 29) would jointly become the market's CBS affiliate through a broader deal that renewed affiliations for the company's five existing CBS stations (KFSM-TV [channel 5] in Fort Smith, Arkansas; WHNT-TV [channel 19] in Huntsville, Alabama; WTKR [channel 3] in Norfolk, Virginia; WTVR-TV [channel 6] in Richmond, Virginia; and WREG-TV [channel 3] in Memphis). WTTV/WTTK originally planned to move its CW affiliation to a digital subchannel upon the January 1, 2015, switch until Tribune decided to sell The CW's Indianapolis affiliation rights to WISH owner Media General (which had completed its merger with that station's former owner LIN Media three days earlier) on December 22, 2014, with WTTV/WTTK opting instead to operate its DT2 subchannel as an independent station. The switch was an upgrade for The CW, due to WISH's prior history as a major network station and its operation of a news department; it was also an upgrade at least for WTTV even if it was arguably one for CBS, as the station had not been a major network affiliate since it lost the ABC affiliation to WLWI (channel 13, now NBC affiliate WTHR) in October 1957, had not maintained a news department since November 1990 or aired any newscasts of its own since the termination of an agreement with ABC affiliate WRTV (channel 6) in December 2002, following Tribune's purchase of the station (the newscasts that Tribune re-established for WTTV upon the switch use resources from WXIN (channel 59)'s existing news department, which began operations in September 1991, but compete against and maintain anchor teams largely separate from its Fox-affiliated sister station). In fact, the major impetus of the deal was that it allowed WTTV to become the local broadcaster of the Indianapolis Colts through CBS' rights to the AFC.

Long-term impact

Growth of Fox Sports
The affiliation switches helped elevate Fox to major network status, on par with its older, established competitors. As of 2015, its sports division has expanded to include Major League Baseball, NASCAR and collegiate events from select NCAA athletic conferences. In addition, Fox aired National Hockey League games from 1995 to 1999 and the Bowl Championship Series (except for the Rose Bowl) from 2007 to 2010. Other former properties include Formula One races (now held by ESPN) and the Cotton Bowl Classic (which moved to ESPN in 2015). Fox Sports' coverage also has expanded to encompass several cable networks, led by its Fox Sports Net chain of regional sports networks (a group launched in 1996, that is composed largely of channels that were formerly part of the Prime Sports and SportsChannel groups) and its two flagship national networks, Fox Sports 1 and Fox Sports 2 (both of which launched in August 2013, replacing existing niche sports networks Speed and Fuel TV). In 2019, Fox Sports Networks were sold to Diamond Sports Group, joint venture of Sinclair Broadcasting Group and Entertainment Studios, and were rebranded into Bally Sports in 2021.

In the fall of 2011, Fox added regular season college football games from the Pac-12 and Big 12 Conferences, and the Big Ten and Pac-12 championship games, as well as four matches per year from the Ultimate Fighting Championship. England's FA Cup final came to the network on May 11, 2013. In August 2013, Fox Sports signed a deal to broadcast the three major open championships of the United States Golf Association, including the U.S. Open, starting in 2015. Current Fox Sports properties seen over-the-air also include exclusive coverage of the Daytona 500, the FIFA World Cup, and from 2009 to 2018, the final game of the UEFA Champions League. In addition, the World Superbike Championship races at Indianapolis Motor Speedway were moved to Fox Sports 1 in 2013.

Rise of Fox in prime time
Fox's entertainment programs have also benefited from the heavy promotion they received during the sports telecasts, including shows that it already aired at the time (such as Beverly Hills, 90210, Melrose Place, Married... with Children, The X-Files and The Simpsons), as well as newer programs (such as American Idol, 24 and House). In fact, Idol was the highest-rated prime time network program for eight consecutive seasons, from 2003–04 to 2010–11, the longest such streak in U.S. television history.

The resilience of CBS
While CBS eventually recovered from the loss of the National Football Conference package, the network's recovery is partially linked to, ironically, its re-acquisition of broadcast rights to the NFL in 1998 when it took over the television contract to the American Football Conference from NBC. The last year that NBC held the AFC rights saw the Denver Broncos, an original AFL team, defeat the Green Bay Packers in Super Bowl XXXII, which aired on NBC and ended a 13-year drought against the NFC in the Super Bowl.

Around the time CBS assumed the American Football Conference rights, the league trend of the 1980s and 1990s reversed, in that the AFC became the dominant NFL conference over the NFC. The New England Patriots dynasty in the 2000s in the only top-10 market at the time with an AFC franchise and no NFC team also contributed to the ratings surge. In fact, the primary stations for both the Broncos and Patriots are the same as when NBC carried the AFC (before their respective switches in September 1995 through the trade deal between CBS/Group W and NBC) – KCNC-TV in Denver and WBZ-TV in Boston (KUSA and WHDH-TV carried those teams' games from August 1995 [WHDH]/September 1995 [KUSA] to January 1998).

In addition, the current AFC deal also saw CBS indirectly acquire the rights to air games played by the Pittsburgh Steelers, which air locally on KDKA-TV (which was a CBS O&O by the time the network re-acquired the NFL rights, and has long been one of CBS's strongest stations) and often earn the highest television ratings for an NFL team due to the Steelers' rabid fanbase on a national level. Coincidentally, before the AFL-NFL merger, the team's road games had aired on KDKA as part of the NFL's deal for CBS to air its games, while home games could not be televised at all during this period, even if tickets for each individual matchup played in the Steelers' home stadium did sell out.  When the Steelers switched to the AFC in 1970 to the end of NFC broadcast rights in 1993, CBS continued airing Steeler home games when NFC teams played at Pittsburgh.

Impact on NBC
As CBS took the hardest hit from the switches, due partly to having been relegated to lower-tier affiliates in several major markets, NBC became the most-watched network in the United States, as it not only experienced the fewest effects of the switchover, but also benefited from a strong slate of programming at the time (including Friends, Frasier, Seinfeld, Law & Order, ER and Dateline NBC). NBC would maintain its ratings lead until 1999, the year after it lost the AFC television rights to CBS, which overtook it for first place.

After Friends and Frasier ended their runs in 2004, NBC largely struggled in the ratings until 2013. Although it would be helped by its exclusive rights to the Olympic Games (a deal effective with the 2000 Summer Olympics in which, along with retaining its existing rights to the Summer Olympics, it assumed the exclusive rights to the Winter Olympics from CBS starting in 2002), the network's ratings troubles were also abetted by a slow decline in its sports division's event portfolio that began with the earlier loss of broadcast rights to the AFC to CBS, and later its share of Major League Baseball rights to Fox in 2000 and its contract with the National Basketball Association (NBA) to ABC and ESPN in 2002. Its attempts to counter those losses and supplement its inherently sporadic Olympics broadcasts were major failures, most infamously with the original incarnation of the XFL and the Arena Football League.

However, one of the few NBC shows to earn strong ratings during the late 2000s and the 2010s was Sunday Night Football, which moved to the network from ESPN in September 2006 as part of the same NFL television contract that saw ABC's venerable Monday Night Football move to ESPN. NBC Sunday Night Football eventually beat Fox's American Idol to become the most watched program on U.S. television beginning in 2012. Additionally, NBC Sports' portfolio was also aided in May 2004 by gaining the rights to air National Hockey League games; however, the network would not air any NHL games until 2006 due to a lockout that canceled the league's 2004–05 season. NBC aired NHL games until 2021 when national rights to the NHL were transferred to ESPN, ABC, and TNT via Turner Sports starting with the 2021–22 season.

Current statuses
On July 17, 1996, News Corporation announced that it would acquire New World outright in an all-stock transaction worth $2.48 billion, making the latter company's ten Fox affiliates owned-and-operated stations of the network; the deal was completed on January 22, 1997. Today, seven of the New World stations that switched to Fox (KDFW, WAGA, WJBK, WITI, KSAZ-TV, WTVT and KTBC) are owned by Fox Corporation – a company created from the acquisition of the since-renamed 20th Century Fox and select other assets owned by 21st Century Fox by The Walt Disney Company (the parent of ABC, which could not legally acquire the Fox network and the television stations group due to the FCC's "dual network" rule that bars common ownership of two of the four major broadcast television networks); 21st Century Fox itself was created from the 2013 split of News Corporation, and the company spun off its U.S. broadcasting businesses prior to the closure of the Disney merger. Fox Television Stations, the division of Fox Corporation that controls the stations, announced on June 13, 2007 – while under News Corporation ownership – its intent to sell nine of its stations, six of which were formerly owned by New World (WJW, KTVI, WDAF-TV, WITI-TV, WBRC and WGHP; Fox also announced it would sell WHBQ-TV, KDVR [channel 31] in Denver and its Fort Collins satellite KFCT [channel 22], and KSTU [channel 13] in Salt Lake City). Of these nine, only WITI is currently located in an NFC market through the Green Bay Packers' unique two-market area encompassing Green Bay and Milwaukee; KTVI, also in an NFC market, was affected in 2016 by the relocation of the Rams from St. Louis to its previous home market of Los Angeles (the primary station for the team in that market is now Fox's West Coast flagship KTTV). On December 21, 2007, Fox sold eight of the stations – excluding WHBQ – to Local TV, a subsidiary of Oak Hill Capital Partners that was formed on May 7 of that year to assume ownership of the broadcasting division of The New York Times Company, for $1.1 billion; this group deal closed on July 14, 2008.

Because of FCC rules that bar same-market ownership of two of the four highest-rated stations by one company, Fox exempted WHBQ from the Local TV sale as that group already owned Memphis' CBS affiliate, WREG-TV; Fox Television Stations took WHBQ off the sale block on January 16, 2009, retaining it as a Fox O&O. As part of its June 24, 2014, acquisition of KTVU and sister independent station KICU-TV (channel 36) from Cox Media Group, Fox announced that it would trade WHBQ and WFXT to Cox in exchange for the San Francisco duopoly; the deal was finalized on October 8, 2014. On January 6, 2009, Local TV announced that it would trade WBRC to Raycom Media, in exchange for CBS affiliate WTVR-TV in Richmond, Virginia. The Local TV stations were operated under a joint management agreement with Tribune Broadcasting, which provided web hosting, technical and engineering services to the Local TV stations, along with news content sharing among all of the stations; the Local TV/Tribune stations also made up the nucleus of the Antenna TV digital subchannel network, which launched in January 2011. Tribune purchased Local TV outright for $2.75 billion on July 1, 2013, adding the seven former Fox O&Os to the six Fox affiliates that it already owned (KSWB-TV; WXIN; KCPQ [channel 13] in Seattle; WXMI [channel 17] in Grand Rapids; WPMT [channel 43] in Harrisburg; and KTXL [channel 40] in Sacramento), making Tribune the largest owner of Fox-affiliated stations by total market coverage (surpassing the Sinclair Broadcast Group, which remains the largest Fox affiliate owner by total number of stations owned and/or operated). The sale was completed on December 27, 2013.

Following an aborted sale of Tribune to Sinclair that ended in a lawsuit centering on the latter's unwillingness to comply with FCC directives to sell conflicting Tribune-owned properties in markets where Sinclair already operated stations, on December 3, 2018, Nexstar Media Group announced it would acquire Tribune—including the five former New World-owned Fox stations then under its purview—in an all-cash deal worth $6.4 billion ($4.1 billion, plus $2.3 billion in debt). The deal was approved by the FCC on September 16, 2019 and was completed three days later on September 19; the deal resulted in Nexstar inheriting Tribune's status as the largest owner of Fox-affiliated stations by total market coverage (combining the ten Fox stations it acquired from Tribune with Nexstar's 31 existing affiliates—primarily located in small and lower-ranked mid-sized markets—that it owned directly or operated through outsourcing agreements) and, incidentally, placed the five ex-Tribune stations involved in the Fox/New World affiliation agreement under common ownership with KHON-TV, which was involved in the Fox/SF Broadcasting agreement. On November 5, 2019, Nexstar announced that would sell WITI and the Seattle sister duopoly of Fox affiliate KCPQ and MyNetworkTV affiliate KZJO to Fox Television Stations for $350 million, in exchange for Fox's Charlotte duopoly of WJZY/WMYT-TV; the deal would make WITI a Fox owned-and-operated station for the second time in its history. Fox stated that Milwaukee and Seattle were "two key markets that align with the company's sports rights" (referring to their primary carriage of Seattle Seahawks and Green Bay Packers home games, respectively, through the network's rights to the National Football Conference). The sale was completed on March 2, 2020.

SF Broadcasting sold its stations on November 28, 1995, to Silver King Communications (a group operated by former Fox executive Barry Diller, which otherwise consisted of Home Shopping Network-affiliated stations); Silver King later sold the four Fox affiliates to Emmis Communications for $307 million in cash and $90 million in stock on April 1, 1998 (Silver King, later known as USA Broadcasting, eventually sold its remaining independent stations and HSN affiliates to Univision Communications in December 2000 to form the nucleus of the present-day UniMás network). Emmis later sold WLUK and WALA to LIN TV on August 22, 2005, as part of a $260 million deal that included WALA's WB-affiliated duopoly partner WBPG (channel 55, now CW affiliate WFNA) and CBS affiliates WTHI-TV (channel 10) in Terre Haute, Indiana and KRQE (channel 13) in Albuquerque, New Mexico; Emmis then sold KHON to the Montecito Broadcast Group (which subsequently sold KHON to New Vision Television, which ironically was purchased by LIN in May 2012) on September 15 of that year, as part of a $259 million deal that included CBS affiliate KOIN (channel 6) in Portland, Oregon, and NBC affiliates KSNW (channel 3) in Wichita and KSNT (channel 27) in Topeka, Kansas. KHON was among the stations acquired by Media General in its 2014 merger with LIN, while the company respectively sold WLUK and WALA to the Sinclair Broadcast Group and the Meredith Corporation (the latter of which Media General announced that it would acquire for $2.4 billion on September 8, 2015, before terminating that deal to accept a counter-offer by Nexstar Broadcasting Group, valued at $4.6 billion, on January 27, 2016) due to ownership conflicts with two existing Media General stations, ABC affiliate WBAY-TV (channel 2) and CBS affiliate WKRG-TV (channel 5) in the Green Bay and Mobile markets; WVTM was sold to Hearst Television due to an ownership conflict in Birmingham with LIN-owned CBS affiliate WIAT through that same merger.

On May 5, 2008, Emmis sold WVUE – whose sale process was made more difficult in the aftermath of Hurricane Katrina, which greatly affected its New Orleans viewing area – to the Louisiana Media Company, founded by New Orleans Saints owner Tom Benson, for $41 million; the sale closed on July 18, 2008. On November 20, 2013, Raycom Media announced it would operate WVUE under a shared services agreement that took effect on December 16, with Louisiana Media retaining ownership of the station. WVUE was among the Raycom stations acquired by Gray Television in a deal worth $3.65 billion that was announced on June 25, 2018, and completed on January 2, 2019.

All of the stations involved in the New World and SF Broadcasting deals, as well as other related affiliation transactions involving Fox (except for two Indiana stations – WTVW in Evansville and WAWV-TV (channel 38, now an ABC affiliate) in Terre Haute – that were affected by the network's 2011 dispute with the Nexstar Broadcasting Group over reverse retransmission consent compensation; and KEVN-TV (channel 7) in Rapid City, South Dakota, which had its Fox affiliation and other intellectual assets transferred to a low-power station in March 2016, in a transaction tied to Schurz Communications' merger with Gray Television that resulted in the intellectual assets of ABC affiliate KOTA-TV [channel 3, now MeTV affiliate KHME] being transferred to KEVN's former full-power signal), remain Fox affiliates.

Westinghouse purchased CBS for $5.4 billion on August 1, 1995, resulting in all of the CBS-affiliated Group W stations becoming CBS O&Os when the sale was completed that November. This merger deal came just one day after The Walt Disney Company announced that it would acquire Capital Cities/ABC, parent company of rival ABC. Viacom bought Westinghouse/CBS for $36 billion in September 1999, which created duopolies in several markets between O&Os of CBS and UPN. Viacom and CBS split in December 2005, with the successor CBS Corporation (a name previously used by the entity that owned CBS's properties under Westinghouse) retaining the company's broadcasting assets, including UPN. CBS—which would reintegrate with the successor Viacom entity to form ViacomCBS (renamed Paramount Global in 2022), incorporated upon completion of the re-merger on December 4, 2019—still owns the stations that it acquired either through the station swap with NBC or through its merger with Westinghouse, except for KUTV, which was sold to the Four Points Media Group in 2007 (the Four Points stations – with the exception of CW affiliate WLWC (channel 28) in Providence – are now owned by the Sinclair Broadcast Group).

On November 3, 2010, ABC sold WJRT and WTVG back to SJL Broadcasting, now owned by the principal owners of Lilly Broadcasting, for $30 million. On July 24, 2014, Gray Television purchased both stations for $128 million. On October 3, 2011, McGraw-Hill sold its television stations to the E. W. Scripps Company for $212 million, adding four ABC affiliates to the six Scripps already owned (WXYZ-TV, WEWS, WCPO-TV, WMAR-TV, KNXV-TV and KGTV (channel 10) in San Diego), making that company the second-largest owner of ABC-affiliated stations by total market coverage (after Argyle successor Hearst Television). On July 29, 2013, Allbritton Communications sold its seven ABC-affiliated stations to the Sinclair Broadcast Group for $985 million. However, in September 2014, Sinclair sold WCIV, WCFT-TV and WJSU-TV to Howard Stirk Holdings due to ownership conflicts with Fox affiliate WTAT-TV (channel 24) and MyNetworkTV affiliate WMMP (channel 36) in Charleston and CW affiliate WTTO/WDBB and MyNetworkTV affiliate WABM (channel 68) in Birmingham, which led to the termination of its local marketing agreement with WTAT through its owner Cunningham Broadcasting, the WCIV intellectual unit and call letters migrating to WMMP, and WDBB and WABM becoming subchannel-only repeaters of WBMA-LD (with WDBB replacing WSES as its west-central Alabama repeater; WGWW also relegated its simulcast of WBMA's programming to a digital subchannel).

Effect in Top 10 markets
To this day, Washington, D.C. is the only Nielsen market ranked among the ten largest U.S. television markets in 1994 outside of New York City, Los Angeles and Chicago that did not have its major network affiliations (outside of network shutdowns and launches) affected during and since the time period of the switches (Atlanta, Dallas and Detroit were affected by the New World deal, while Boston and Philadelphia were affected via the Westinghouse deal).

While Houston was the only major Southern city not affected by the switches and its major network affiliates still remain the same, it did not become a Top 10 market until 2005–06 when it swapped the 10th position with Detroit.  Instead, Houston was in the midst of ownership realignments that began a decade before and have remained the same since. CBS affiliate KHOU was acquired by Belo Corporation (now part of Tegna) in 1984. KTRK-TV became an ABC owned-and-operated station when its owner Capital Cities completed its acquisition of ABC in January 1986 and Fox launched on KRIV as a charter O&O in October of that year. Post-Newsweek Stations announced its acquisition of KPRC-TV from its locally owned semi-original owner, H&C Communications, on April 22, 1994; H&C was divesting its assets in preparation for its dissolution. On September 18, 1995, Tribune Broadcasting announced its acquisition of KHTV from Gaylord Broadcasting; KHTV joined The WB two days later. KHTV did not become an affiliate of The WB at the January 11 launch because of Gaylord's entanglements with CBS' negotiations for an affiliation with KTVT to replace long-time affiliate, KDFW, in the aftermath of Fox's affiliation deal New World Communications.

San Francisco was also unaffected by the 1994 switches, as Westinghouse-owned KPIX-TV had been a CBS affiliate since it signed on in 1948. However, on January 1, 2002, KRON-TV (channel 4) became an independent station after a bitter dispute between NBC and the station's then-owner Young Broadcasting (which merged with Media General in 2013); after Young outbid NBC to buy the station from the Chronicle Publishing Company (publishers of the San Francisco Chronicle, which was sold to the Hearst Corporation as part of a liquidation of Chronicle's assets) for $823 million in November 1999, NBC demanded that Young run the station under the conventions of an NBC O&O as a condition of renewing its affiliation; Young refused these demands, along with the affiliation renewal. In February 2000, NBC struck an affiliation deal with Granite Broadcasting-owned KNTV (channel 11) in San Jose; it became a WB affiliate (in conjunction with the network's existing Bay Area affiliate, then-sister station KBWB (channel 20, now independent station KOFY-TV)) in July 2000 after agreeing to disaffiliate from ABC due to a market exclusivity claim for the network in San Jose by ABC O&O KGO-TV (channel 7). NBC announced its acquisition of KNTV from Granite on December 17, 2001, and formally took control of the station in April 2002.

A similar situation occurred in Boston 15 years later. WHDH (channel 7) – which replaced WBZ-TV as an NBC affiliate in 1995 through the CBS/Group W deal – lost its NBC affiliation on January 1, 2017, after owner Sunbeam Television's refusal to sell WHDH to NBC led the network to decline renewal of its affiliation agreement and create an owned-and-operated station from scratch; the parties' strained relationship traces to Sunbeam owner Ed Ansin's objections to NBC's 1987 purchase of WTVJ to replace WSVN (channel 7) as its Miami outlet (a move which led to WSVN assuming the Fox affiliation from CBS-acquired WCIX in January 1989), and conflicts surrounding WHDH's aborted 2009 plans to substitute short-lived prime time talk show strip The Jay Leno Show with a simulcast of the 10:00 p.m. newscast it produces for CW-affiliated sister station WLVI (channel 56) due to the uncertainty of Lenos potential effect on its 11:00 newscast's viewership, which proved to be correct and led to Jay Leno controversially re-taking The Tonight Show back from Conan O'Brien after just seven months. Through NBC's contracts with the NFL, WHDH served as the local broadcaster of the Foxborough-based New England Patriots from 1995 to 1997 (most Patriots games have aired since then on WBZ-TV, through CBS' 1998 acquisition of the AFC television contract), and carried occasional Patriots Sunday Night Football games from 2006 to 2016.

While early reports suggested that NBC would move to existing Telemundo O&O WNEU (channel 60), it eventually purchased low-powered WNEU repeater WBTS-LD (channel 8) from ZGS Communications in September 2016 to carry "NBC Boston," and initiated simulcasting arrangements with WNEU (which respectively relays WBTS-LD's NBC and Cozi TV programming on two of its digital subchannels) and WMFP (channel 62, which maintains a subchannel leasing agreement with NBC) to help provide full-market coverage; WBTS formed its news department through resources from New England Cable News (which NBCUniversal acquired through its 2011 acquisition by Comcast), employing both existing NECN staff and newer hires. Ansin filed a court challenge to stop the planned switch on grounds that a potential transfer of the network to Merrimack, New Hampshire-based WNEU – which provides signal coverage ranging from Grade B to non-existent in the southern half of the Boston market – would violate an FCC-imposed condition of Comcast's 2011 acquisition of NBCUniversal to maintain over-the-air availability of NBC programming and not use its cable properties to influence affiliation deals (Massachusetts District Court Judge Richard Stearn dismissed the suit per Comcast's request on May 16, 2016, citing realities of corporate competition); Senators Edward Markey and Elizabeth Warren also expressed concerns that OTA-reliant viewers living in neighborhoods and outlying suburbs of Boston outside of WNEU's signal range would not have access to NBC programs. Rather than assume WLVI's CW affiliation, Sunbeam chose to operate WHDH as a news-intensive independent station, filling morning and evening time periods formerly occupied by NBC programs with an expanded morning newscast, and a revamped prime time lineup of syndicated programs and an expanded 2½-hour news block (including a simulcast of the WLVI newscast). Eventually NBC purchased a low-power station in Nashua, New Hampshire and then immediately placed it into a channel sharing agreement with the WGBH Educational Foundation, de facto making what is now WBTS-CD (channel 15) a low-power station transmitting market-wide using the full-power spectrum of WGBX-TV (channel 44) from its Needham transmitter.

See also
 1994 in American television
 2006 United States broadcast TV realignment – the next major affiliation shuffle in America, involving the shutdowns of The WB and UPN and the subsequent launches of The CW and MyNetworkTV
 2001 Vancouver TV realignment – a similar event that occurred in Canada involving five television stations in southern British Columbia
 2007 Canada broadcast TV realignment

References

Citations

Notes

External links

 Essay on cause of WBZ-WHDH affiliation switch, including a chart of changes

Fox Broadcasting Company

E. W. Scripps Company
American Broadcasting Company
Westinghouse Broadcasting
CBS Television Network
National Broadcasting Company
UPN
The WB

History of television in the United States
National Football League on television
History of National Football League broadcasting
1994 in American television
1995 in American television
1996 in American television
1997 in American television
1994 in economics
1995 in economics
1996 in economics
1997 in economics
News Corporation